Translucidus is a cloud variety, it appears in altocumulus, altostratus, stratus, and stratocumulus clouds, this cloud variety is very recognizable, with its only feature being that it is translucent, and gives away the location of the Sun and Moon, and sometimes, it lets stars in the night sky be visible, it is the opposite of the cloud variety opacus, which isnt translucent, but opaque. 

This cloud variety manifests in clouds with thin water particles or ice crystals

Examples

See also 

Perlucidus (cloud variety)

Opacus (cloud variety)

References 

Cloud types